Yunyu(王韵毓) is an Australian musician, film composer and singer-songwriter originally from Singapore, now living in New South Wales.

She won Australia’s Triple J Unearthed in 2002 with the song "You are Expendable", followed up with "A Prayer" a year later from her self-titled EP. Her music is mostly played on keyboards,  pianoforte and synthesizers. Occasionally, when looking for variety, she will play the guzheng.

Yunyu is an alumna of the Australian Film Television and Radio School (AFTRS) with a Graduate Diploma of Screen Music, taught by Martin Armiger, Christopher Gordon and Kirke Godfrey.

Yunyu won the Crystal Pine award for Best Original Score | Short Film category at the 2015 International Samobor Film Music Festival for her work on a hybrid documentary, inspired by Ted Egan’s folk song, "The Drover’s Boy".

Filmography
Yunyu is credited as music composer:
 Eternal Return (2014) directed by Vedrana Music
 Over The Hills And Far Away (2014) directed by Luke Marsden
 The Drover’s Boy (2014) directed by Margaret McHugh
 Legacy (2014) directed by Josh Mawer

Releases
2012
Dorothy (Single)
Reimagining of Dorothy from "The Wizard of Oz" inspired by the lost cosmonauts urban myth.

Butterflies (Single)
Based on Chinese folk tale, "The Butterfly Lovers". Also featured on a transmedia collaboration with Kylie Chan’s "Small Shen" published by HarperCollins.

2011
Angel Arias (Single)
Transmedia collaboration with Marianne de Pierres' "Burn Bright", commissioned by Random House Publishing.

2006
Spiked Soul

Her song "You are Expendable" topped the Canadian college Charts for a month peaking at No.6.

"Lenore’s Song" is a reply letter to Edgar Allan Poe’s "The Raven".

2004
Yunyu (EP)

Music videos
The music video for Lenore’s Song, produced in collaboration with director Tahnee McGuire and 'Lord of the Rings' cinematographer Callan Green and producer Matt Carter among others, was made of 16,000 digital pictures. It has been entered in competitions, winning a Gold Award and being a finalist in others.
 2007 iPod Film Festival Finalist
 2006 ACS NSW & ACT Award for Cinematography Gold Award
 2006 ATOM Awards Finalist
 2006 SunScreen Film Clip Festival Finalist

References

External links
 Official site
 2015 Film Music Award Winners - International Samobor Film Music Festival

Australian women musicians
Australian singer-songwriters
Australian women singer-songwriters
Australian women composers
Australian composers
Australian people of Chinese descent